Levin Thomas Jones (July 4, 1847 – September 20, 1914)  was a professional baseball player during the mid-1870s who played parts of two seasons in the National Association of Professional Base Ball Players. Jones played in a single game for the Baltimore Marylands on May 14, and collected three hits in four at bats, for a .750 batting average, and had one run batted in, while playing in center field. In , he played in two games for the Baltimore Canaries, one game as their right fielder, and one as their catcher. In seven at bats, he collected one hit, for a .143 batting average, and had one run batted in. He did not appear in another game in the top professional leagues after this season.

References

External links

Major League Baseball outfielders
Major League Baseball catchers
Baltimore Marylands players
Baltimore Canaries players
19th-century baseball players
Year of birth unknown
Year of death unknown
Baseball players from Maryland